Venlo railway station is located in Venlo, the Netherlands. It is situated on the Maastricht–Venlo railway, the Viersen–Venlo railway, the Venlo–Eindhoven railway and the Nijmegen–Venlo railway.

The first station in Venlo was opened on November 21, 1865. The current building dates from 1958 and is a typical Dutch station of the post-war era, featuring a clock tower and a large canopy spanning the front of the station.

There is a bus station for regional and city buses in front of the station, as well as a car park.

Train services
The following train services call at this station:
Express services:
Intercity: Schiphol Airport–Utrecht–'s-Hertogenbosch–Eindhoven–Helmond–Venlo
: Venlo–Viersen–Mönchengladbach–Düsseldorf–Wuppertal–Hagen–Hamm
Local services:
Stoptrein: Nijmegen–Venlo–Roermond

Venlo is a border station and therefore sees a significant number of shunting movements. On several tracks, the catenary can be switched between the 15 kV 16.7 Hz AC used on the Deutsche Bahn network and the 1500 V DC used by Nederlandse Spoorwegen network.

Bus services 

 City buses
 1: Blerick Vossener–Venlo Station–Venlo Hospital–Tegelen–Kaldenkirchen
 2: Blerick Klingerberg–Venlo Station–Venlo City Centre–Venlo Stalberg
 3: Venlo Station–City Centre–'t Ven–Noorderpoort–City Centre–Venlo Station
 Regional buses
 66: Venlo Station–Tegelen–Belfeld–Reuver–Beesel–Swalmen–Roermond Station
 70: Venlo Station–Blerick–Venlo Freshpark–Sevenum–Horst
 83: Venlo Station–Venlo–Velden–Lomm–Arcen–Wellerlooi–Well–Aijen–Nieuw-Bergen–Afferden–Heijen–Gennep–Ottersum–Milsbeek–Plasmolen–Mook–Molenhoek–Heumen–Malden–Nijmegen–Nijmegen Central Station
87: Venray Station–Leunen–Castenray–Horst–Sevenum–Heierhoeve–Blerick–Venlo Station
 88: Venray Station–Oostrum–Wanssum–Meerlo–Tienray–Swolgen–Broekhuizenvorst–Broekhuizen–Lottum–Grubbenvorst–Blerick–Venlo Station
 370: (Limburgliner): Venlo Station–Venlo–Blerick–Maasbree–Helden–Panningen–Beringe–Meijel–Ospeldijk–Ospel–Nederweert–Weert
 377: (Limburgliner): Venlo Station–Hout-Blerick–Baarlo–Kessel–Kesseleik–Neer–Nunhem–Haelen–Horn–Roermond Station
669: (school line): Meijel–Beringe–Panningen–Helden–Panningen
 670: (school line): Venlo Station–Blerick–Maasbree–Helden–Panningen
671: Venlo–Blerick–Greenport–Grubbenvorst
683: (school line): Well–Wellerlooi–Arcen–Lomm–Velden–Venlo
687: (school line): Horst–Sevenum–Heierhoeve–Blerick–Venlo

References

External links

NS website 
Dutch public transport travel planner 

Railway stations in Venlo
Railway stations opened in 1865
Railway stations on the Maaslijn
Railway stations on the Staatslijn E
Railway stations on the Staatslijn G